Sevtap Altunoluk (born 10 January 1995) is a Turkish Paralympian goalball player having visual impairment. She is a member of the national team taking part at the 2020 Summer Paralympics. She is a native of Tokat in Turkey.

Her sister Sevda Altunoluk is also a national goalball player.

She played with the national team, which won the gold medal at the 2019 European Goalball Championship in Rostock, Germany.

Honours

International
  2019 IBSA Goalball European Championship in Rostock, Germany.
  2020 Summer Paralympics in Tokyo, Japan
  2021 IBSA Goalball European Championship in Samsun, Turkey.

References

1995 births
Living people
Sportspeople from Tokat
Turkish blind people
Female goalball players
Turkish goalball players
Goalball players at the 2020 Summer Paralympics
Paralympic goalball players of Turkey
21st-century Turkish sportswomen